Marcos Sebastián Aguirre (born March 30, 1984 in Arroyito, Córdoba) is an Argentine football winger who plays for Deportivo Pasto in the Categoría Primera A.

Career
Aguirre started his professional career in 2004 with Club Atlético Lanús, gradually establishing himself as an important member of the first team. In 2007, he was part of the squad that won the Apertura 2007 tournament, Lanús' first ever top flight title.

In January 2008, Aguirre was loaned to Real Valladolid, being unsuccessful during a one 1/2 year stint, as he was mainly used as a substitute. He did, however, score on the last day of the 2008–09 season in a crucial relegation match away to Real Betis which ended 1–1, after having replaced injured Pedro León. Betis eventually relegated with that draw, but the Castile and León outfit maintained its status. Upon the end of his loan spell, Aguirre returned to Lanús in 2009.

Back in Argentina, Aguirre scored the first goal of the 2010–11 Argentine Primera División season in a 2–1 win over Arsenal de Sarandí. At the end of the semester, the winger was loaned again by Lanús, this time to Arsenal de Sarandí.

Honours

References

External links
 Marcos Aguirre – Fútbol XXI profile at Fútbol XXI  
 
 
 
 

1984 births
Living people
Sportspeople from Córdoba Province, Argentina
Argentine expatriate footballers
Argentine footballers
Association football wingers
Argentine Primera División players
Club Atlético Lanús footballers
Arsenal de Sarandí footballers
La Liga players
Real Valladolid players
C.D. Antofagasta footballers
Club Nacional de Football players
Uruguayan Primera División players
Chilean Primera División players
Expatriate footballers in Uruguay
Expatriate footballers in Chile
Expatriate footballers in Spain
Expatriate footballers in Venezuela
Argentine expatriate sportspeople in Spain
Pan American Games medalists in football
Pan American Games gold medalists for Argentina
Footballers at the 2003 Pan American Games
Medalists at the 2003 Pan American Games